Půlnoční zpověď is a 2023 Czech television series broadcast by Prima televize. It starrs Markéta Plánková and Marek Lambora. It was produced as part of Prima Originals for streaming service Prima+.

Plot
The series tells story of two siblings, Stela Skoumalová and Albert Skoumal. Stela Skoumalová is a psychologist and a relationship therapist. Her brother Albert Skoumal is a priest and scientist. Everything starts with death of Stela's client Marina Krausová. Before her death, Mariana brought Stela a branded handbag full of jewels. The case appears to be a suicide to the police at first but Stela in her statement intentionally conceals the existence of jewelry as she wants to find out who it really belongs to. During a difficult life situation, her estranged brother Albert becomes the only person she can still trust. However his behavior risks his professional reputation and a happy marriage.

Cast
Markéta Plánková as Stela Skoumalová
Marek Lambora as Albert Skoumal
Marek Taclík as Investigator
Lukáš Příkazký as kpt. Vítězslav Vichr
Jiří Dvořák as Skoumal
Saša Rašilov as Olda

References

External links 
Official site
IMDB site
ČSFD site

Czech crime television series
Czech drama television series
2023 Czech television series debuts
Prima televize original programming
2023 Czech television series endings